Rock Creek Methodist Church is a historic Methodist church building in Needy, Oregon near Canby, Oregon.  It was built in 1858 and was added to the National Register of Historic Places in 1975.

It was deemed notable as one of few remaining circuit church buildings from early Oregon.  According to its NRHP nomination, "The simple elegance of this structure stands as an
example of the unpretentious lives of early Oregon settlers."

It is a one-story  building.  John Killan led the construction.  The vestibule was added in about 1920.

References

Methodist churches in Oregon
Churches on the National Register of Historic Places in Oregon
Churches completed in 1858
Buildings and structures in Clackamas County, Oregon
1858 establishments in Oregon Territory
National Register of Historic Places in Clackamas County, Oregon